King is a census-designated place in Town of Farmington, Waupaca County, Wisconsin. As of the 2010 census, it had a population of 1,750. Before 2010, it was part of the Chain O' Lakes-King, Wisconsin CDP.

History
In 1887, the area was selected by the Grand Army of the Republic for the site of a veterans' home. The Soldiers' Home was later renamed the Wisconsin Veterans Home. The community is named for General Charles King, a Wisconsin soldier and head of the state's National Guard.

Images

References

External links

 Wisconsin Veterans Home in King

Census-designated places in Wisconsin
Census-designated places in Waupaca County, Wisconsin
Buildings and structures in Waupaca County, Wisconsin
National Register of Historic Places in Waupaca County, Wisconsin